is a Japanese multinational food and biotechnology corporation which produces seasonings, interlayer insulating materials for semiconductor packages for use in personal computers, cooking oils, frozen foods, beverages, sweeteners, amino acids, and pharmaceuticals.  is the trade name for the company's original monosodium glutamate (MSG) product, the first of its kind, since 1909. The corporation's head office is located in Chūō, Tokyo. , Ajinomoto operates in 36 countries and employs an estimated 33,651 people. Its yearly revenue in 2021 is around ¥1.1 trillion JPY or $8 billion USD.

History

1907–1944: Origins and expansion

Ajinomoto Co., Inc. was created in 1908 as a subsidiary of Suzuki Pharmaceutical Co., Ltd., which was founded in May 1907 by Saburosuke Suzuki II and Kikunae Ikeda. Ajinomoto was created to let Ikeda, a professor at Tokyo Imperial University, sell monosodium glutamate (MSG) seasoning made from wheat that he invented and patented. He created the seasoning after discovering that MSG was the source of a flavor that he called umami. In April 1909, Ajinomoto presented Ikeda's seasoning under the brand name "AJI-NO-MOTO" at a new product exhibition event in Tokyo, and began selling the product the next month. Ajinomoto primarily marketed the seasoning to housewives by using their trademark, a housewife in an apron, in newspaper advertisements, on signboards, and on-ground stamps.

Output gradually increased from 4.7 tons in 1910 to 23.3 tons in 1913, with sales reaching 400,000 yen. In 1914 Ajinomoto built a new factory in Kawasaki to expand its production of flavoring. Japan's improved economy after World War I resulted in output hitting 84.6 tons and sales reaching 1,563,000 yen in 1918. Despite rising sales, Ajinomoto experienced a deficit during its first ten years due to altering its methods of production and lowering its prices to get its product into ordinary households, among other reasons. Because of rising Japanese exports after World War I, Ajinomoto opened offices in New York and Shanghai in 1917 and 1918, respectively. In 1918 Ajinomoto exported 20.5 tons of its seasoning, accounting for a quarter of its total sales. The company opened new offices in Singapore and Hong Kong in 1927 and in Taiwan in 1929 to distribute its product throughout Southeast Asia. Between 1920 and 1929, revenue from the seasoning's sales rose from 2,799 thousand yen to 10,543 thousand yen, largely due to increased exports of the product to foreign markets.

To lower the cost of mass production, the seasoning's wheat was replaced with soybeans, as the price of the latter at the time was lower than the former's. In the United States, the seasoning, labeled by the FDA as a "Vegetable Protein Derivative", sold poorly on the consumer market, but Ajinomoto expanded their operations in the United States in 1931 due to mass orders of the seasoning by H.J. Heinz, Co. and Campbell Soup Co. Between 1931 and 1937, seasoning production increased from 1,077 tons to 3,750 tons, with revenue rising from 13 million yen to 27 million yen. Due to Japan's increasing isolationism in the late 1930s, the production of AJI-NO-MOTO decreased from 3,750 tons in 1937 to 2,339 tons in 1940. By 1942, production of the seasoning was reduced to 1,000 tons before completely stopping by 1944 due to World War II.

1945–1979: Post-war Japan and diversification
After World War II, Ajinomoto was slow to resume production of its seasoning as it lacked sufficient funds to continue production and its factory had been destroyed. In April 1946, the company changed its name to Ajinomoto Co., Ltd. In 1947 production of the seasoning resumed, in addition to the production of new food products such as nucleic acid-based seasonings and processed foods. In May 1949 Ajinomoto was listed on the Japanese stock exchange. By 1950, exports accounted for 95% of the company's revenue, with exports to Southeast Asia, Europe, and the United States increasing in subsequent years. In Europe, AJI-NO-MOTO was used as a seasoning by many processed food manufacturers, including Maggie GmbH and C.H. Knorr AG. In 1950, sales in Japan resumed after the lifting of postwar sales controls, surpassing pre-war sales by 1953.

In the 1960s, Ajinomoto began to diversify its production by securing alliances with international food companies, including the Kellogg Company in 1962, CPC International Inc. in 1963, and Best Foods Company Ltd. in 1964. Because of these partnerships, Ajinomoto began selling Kellogg's corn flakes and Knorr soup in Japan and created its own brand of mayonnaise. During this time period, Ajinomoto modified AJI-NO-MOTO's recipe by using amino acids from sugar cane instead of soybeans, which allowed the seasoning to be produced locally in the countries it was exported to, which reduced shipping costs for the company. Domestic production first began in Thailand in 1962, followed by the Philippines, Malaysia, Peru, Indonesia, and Brazil in subsequent years. By 1979, nearly half of all AJI-NO-MOTO was being produced outside of Japan.

In the 1970s, Ajinomoto diversified further by launching a flavored seasoning called HON-DASHI in 1970 and producing frozen foods in 1972. In 1973 Ajinomoto and General Foods Inc. launched Ajinomoto General Foods Inc., a joint venture between the two companies that would sell instant coffee. In 1978, Ajinomoto launched a brand of Chinese seasonings under the brand name Cook Do. In Asian and Latin American markets, Ajinomoto created new products for consumers, while the company primarily delivered its products to processed food manufacturers in Europe and the United States.

During this era, the company also expanded into other product markets. In 1956, the company began supplying crystalline amino acids for pharmaceutical use, contributing to the world's first release of amino acids infusion. In the 1960s and 1970s, the company developed feed-use amino acids, pharmaceuticals such as enteral nutrients, and specialty chemicals like surfactants.

1980–2009: Expansion globally
As the Japanese economy worsened in the 1980s, Ajinomoto sought to outsource more of its production overseas, which increased the number of employees the company employed overseas from 4,000 in 1979 to more than 11,000 in 1996. Starting in 1980, Ajinomoto began to refocus its diversification efforts from food products to its amino acid business. Following the US FDA's re-approval of aspartame in 1981, Ajinomoto began producing the sweetener at its Tokai factory in 1982. In 1987, Ajinomoto began researching drug development in the fields of clinical nutrition, anti-cancer drugs, infectious diseases, and cardiovascular drugs. Through this research, the company developed ELENTAL for use in clinical nutrition, LIVACT to fight liver disease, and Lentinan in collaboration with the Japanese Foundation for Cancer Research. Ajinomoto later released JINO as a cosmetic and amino acid for athletes, followed by Amino Vital, a supplement to JINO released in 1995. In 2000, Ajinomoto acquired NutraSweet and Euro-Aspartame from Monsanto.

In April 2002 Ajinomoto reorganized itself into food, amino acid, and medicine divisions, and owned subsidiaries for frozen foods, fats, and oils. In February 2003, Ajinomoto and Unilever completed a joint venture agreement in six countries and regions of Asia. Because of this, Ajinomoto launched the brand VONO to replace its use of the Knorr brand, and in the process established its own brand identity. In July 2003, Ajinomoto bought the French company Orsan from the UK-based Tate and Lyle Group, renaming Orsan to AJI-NO-MOTO Foods, Europe. In November 2005, AJI-NO-MOTO Pharmaceuticals USA, Inc. was liquidated, and its assets and functions were merged into AJI-NO-MOTO Pharmaceuticals, Europe. In January 2006, Ajinomoto bought the cooking sauce and condiments manufacturer Amoy Food from the French dairy product company Groupe Danone. In 2009, the company released "Ajinomoto" to commemorate the 100th anniversary of its foundation.

Since 2010: Expansion and restructuring
In 2010, due to a rise in foreign competition, Ajinomoto began restructuring to focus on several of its products while divesting others. The company divested its Calpis beverage unit in Japan in 2012, the Ajinomoto Sweetener Company (France) in October 2015, and Amoy Food (China) in November 2018.  Ajinomoto decided to focus on its food and biomedical divisions, and acquired the contract manufacturing organization Althea Technologies (USA) in 2013, the frozen food company Windsor Quality Holdings, Inc. (USA) in November 2014, and the frozen food company Lavelli・Terrell・Smile (France) in November 2017. In April 2016, Ajinomoto merged its pharmaceutical division with Eisai, launching  in Japan. In October 2017, Ajinomoto introduced a "Global Brand Logo" for use throughout the Ajinomoto group. In December 2017, Ajinomoto announced it had begun construction to expand its Kawasaki Plant, along with the construction of a new R&D building. In October 2018, Ajinomoto Althea (USA) and OmniChem (Belgium) merged to form Ajinomoto Bio-Pharma Services.

In April 2020, the Ajinomoto Group Nutrient Profiling System for Product, which has been developed as a method to scientifically estimate the nutritive value of products such as powdered soup and frozen foods, was introduced globally to about 500 kinds of group products in seven countries.  In August, Ajinomoto announced its participation in the international environment initiative RE100 for renewable energy.

In November 2020, "AJISWEET RA", produced in Japan cooperating with Morita Kagaku Kogyo Co., Ltd., was newly launched to the USA as stevia sweetener reducing bitterness and off-flavors. In December, Ajinomoto Group made a wholly owned supplement company in Ireland by a share purchase agreement with Nualtra Limited in order to enter Europe's oral nutritional supplements market.

In December 2020, Ajinomoto was included by CDP in its "Climate Change A List for 2020" for the first time, as one of the most outstanding companies in terms of climate change-related initiatives and information disclosure for its climate impact. in 2021, Ajinomoto joined WIPO GREEN as an official partner in an effort to address climate change.

In February 2021, Ajinomoto Animal Nutrition Group Inc. transferred all of its 100% equity stake in Ajinomoto Animal Nutrition Europe S.A., a European feed-use amino acid company, to METabolic EXplorer, a French operating company with strengths in R&D of fermentation technologies.

On the Tokyo Nutrition Summit 2021,  held on December 7–8, 2021, Ajinomoto announced its Nutrition Commitment, a specific goal for improving nutrition, and registered it on the commitment registration website (Global Nutrition Report) on October 26.

Products

List of Ajinomoto brands

Seasonings

 AJI-NO-MOTO●
 AJI-NO-MOTOPLUS
 AJI-PLUS
 AJI-SHIO
 Chuka-Aji
 Hi-Me
 HON-DASHI●
 KOJI-AJI
 RosDee (Thailand)●
 RosDee Krua Krob Ros (Thailand)
 Takumi-Aji (Thailand)
 Aji-Ginisa (Philippines)
 Aji-ngon (Vietnam)
 AMOY (Russia)
 Moslaji (Bangladesh)
 AJI-SAL (Brazil)
 DeliDawa (Nigeria)
 Sazón (Brazil)
 Doña Gusta (Peru)
 Ajinomix (Peru)
 KEMAL KÜKRER (Turkey, Japan, Peru)
 Chicken Powder (Philippines)
 Sarsaya Oyster Sauce (Philippines)

Processed foods

 Cook Do (Japan)●
 Nabe-Cube (Japan)
 Steam Me (Japan)
 Ajinomoto KK Consommé
 Knorr (Japan, under license from Unilever)
 Pure Select Mayonnaise
 Ajinomoto Olive Oil
 Ajinomoto Canola Oil
 Ajinomoto Rice Oil (Japan)
 Rumic Pasta sauce
 Oyakata (Europe)
 Samsmak (Europe)
 Noodle'im (Turkey)
 BizimMutfak (Turkey)
 YumYum (Thailand, Indonesia, Europe, Japan)
 Vono (Brazil)
 A&M (India)●
 MaDish (Nigeria)
 Tasty Boy (Philippines)
 Ajinomen (Peru, Colombia)
 Crispy Fry
 Just Deli (Poland)
 Rasa Sifu (Malaysia)
 TUMIX (Malaysia, Singapore)
 Seri-Aji (Malaysia)
 Masako (Indonesia)
 Sajiku (Indonesia)
 SAORI (Indonesia)
 Mayumi (Indonesia)

Frozen foods

 Taipei (USA)●
 LingLing (USA)●
 JoseOle (USA)
 Posada (USA)
 Bernardi (USA)
 Freds (USA)
 Whitley's (USA)
 Chilli Bowl (USA)
 Golden Tiger (USA)
 Ajinomoto Frozen Foods (USA, Europe, Thailand)
 Gyoza (France, Russia, Singapore)●
 Yakitori (France)
 Ramen (France)
 Yasaï Men (France)
 Spring Roll (Russia)
 Various cakes (China)
 CRISPY FRIED CHICKEN
 SHRIMP SHUMAI

Sweetener

 Pal Sweet
 Lite Sugar (Thailand)

Coffee products

 Maxim instant coffee
 Blendy●
 Sen
 Marim
 Birdy (Thailand, Indonesia, Vietnam)●

Powder beverages

 Prottie (Thailand)
 Fres-C (Philippines)
 FIT (Brazil) 
 Mid (Brazil)
 MISKÍSIMOO (Peru)

Ajinomoto animal nutrition

 L-Lysine
 L-Threonine
 L-Tryptophan
 AjiPro-L●

Sports nutrition

 amino VITAL[PRO, Gold, Amino Protein, amino shot] (Japan, Thailand, Indonesia, Philippines, Brazil)
 AjiPure (USA)
 Fusi-BCAA (USA)

Food products 
In 1909, Ajinomoto Co. Inc. released its umami seasoning AJI-NO-MOTO, made from molasses and tapioca starch derived from sugarcane. In Asia and Latin America, the product was primarily sold to consumers, while in North America and Europe it was mostly sold to processed food manufacturers. In 1970, Ajinomoto launched the bonito flavored seasoning HON-DASHI in Japan, and later adapted the product to other markets with local flavors. In 1978 Ajinomoto released Cook Do, a series of Chinese cuisine seasoning products, and later added other cuisine seasoning flavors to the Cook Do product line. The company entered the frozen food business in 1972, and currently sells a variety of frozen food products, including dumplings, noodles, and cooked rice. In 1982, Ajinomoto Co., Inc. entered the sweetener business by producing aspartame. In 1984 it released a low-calorie consumer sweetener PAL SWEET. By 2021, Ajinomoto was ranked 6th overall and 1st in Asia on FoodTalks' Top 50 Global Sweetener Companies list. Ajinomoto Co., Inc. is the world's largest manufacturer of aspartame, sold under the trade name Aminosweet. Ajinomoto also sells soup, mayonnaise, porridge, pasta sauce, and instant noodles under the "VONO" brand name. Through Ajinomoto AGF Corporation, Ajinomoto sells instant coffee, regular coffee, bottled coffee, stick coffee, and canned coffee, and is the top coffee brand in Thailand with a 70% market share.

Ajinomoto's Yum Yum brand of instant noodles in 2019 held a 20–21% share of Thailand's 17 billion baht instant noodle market.

Animal nutrition 
The Ajinomoto Group started an animal nutrition business in 1965 and subsequently established an international production and supply system for amino acids to be used in animal feed. Ajinomoto developed a lysine formula called AjiPro-L for lactating dairy cows, which allows the lysine to reach the intestine without decomposing in the stomach.

Chemicals and semiconductors 
Ajinomoto has developed mild cleansing agents such as Amisoft and Amilite, and humectant emollients such as Eldew and Amihop. It also manufactures for companies such as Daiichi Sankyo Healthcare Co., Ltd. to develop products like the moisturizing detergent Minon.

Ajinomoto developed its resin functional materials business using technology obtained through the production of MSG.

Ajinomoto developed the Ajinomoto Build-up Film (ABF) interlayer insulating materials for semiconductor packages in high-performance CPUs, it was developed from the basic research on applications of amino acid chemistry to epoxy resins and their composites. The project is started in 1996 under the directory of Shigeo Nakamura.

Healthcare 
The Ajinomoto Group's healthcare business is based on using the fermentation technology of amino acids. In 1956, Ajinomoto began producing the world's first amino acid infusion, enteral nutrition products, and crystalline amino acids that could be used as raw materials in pharmaceutical products. Currently, Ajinomoto manufactures around twenty kinds of amino acids at various factories overseas, including plants in Japan, the United States, Europe, and India. In 1995, Ajinomoto began selling an amino acid supplement called Amino Vital for professional sports athletes. In 2011, Ajinomoto began offering an "Amino Index" health checkup, which statistically analyzes the difference in amino acid concentrations between healthy individuals and adults suffering from cancer and other serious diseases to aid the early detection of cancer and other diseases. In addition to glutamates as a seasoning, the company also produces other amino acids such as L-Leucine, L-Tyrosine, Glycine, and L-Phenylalanine, which it markets as dietary supplements under the brand name AjiPure.

Corporate structure

Representative directors
 Taro Fujie, President & CEO
 Hiroshi Shiragami, Representative Executive Officer & Executive Vice President, Chief Innovation Officer (CIO)

Divisions and global locations
Ajinomoto currently operates separate divisions for North America, Latin America, and Asia, with Europe, the Middle East, and Africa being combined into the EMEA division. Ajinomoto also owns dozens of subsidiaries globally for its food, biochemical, and healthcare businesses.

Brand identity

Controversies

Lysine price fixing
In 1986, the Ajinomoto Group produced lysine at its Iowa factory of Heartland Lysine Co. U.S.A., followed by production in its Pathum Thani factory in Ajinomoto, Thailand in 1986, and Bio Italia, BioPro in Italy in 1992, gradually upgrading its worldwide production bases. In the United States, competitors tried to increase lysine production, which resulted in pricing issues due to an overabundance of lysine on the market. To raise prices, several companies price fixed lysine in the 1990s. Along with Kyowa Hakko Kogyo and Sewon America, Inc., Ajinomoto settled with the United States Department of Justice Antitrust Division in September 1996. Each firm and an executive from each pleaded guilty as part of a plea bargain to aid in further investigation. Their cooperation led to Archer Daniels Midland settling charges with the US government in October 1996 for $100 million, a record antitrust fine at the time. Cartels were able to raise lysine prices 70% within its first six months of cooperation.

MSG
The safety of MSG, as related to the corporate image of Ajinomoto, has been a point of discussion since 1910, with unsubstantiated rumors relating to the use of serpents in its raw materials. Since the 1940s, safety concerns have been voiced several times by public institutions in both Japan and the United States. Additional concerns included Chinese restaurant syndrome in the 1960s and the call for greater regulation on the use of MSG, which was based on the work of Professor John Olney, in 1969. In 1996, the FDA commissioned the Federation of American Society for Experimental Biology (FASEB) to study the effects of MSG, who concluded that MSG is safe for most people. At the time, Ajinomoto also noted the possibility that asthma patients and carriers with symptoms of Chinese restaurant syndrome symptoms may be affected, but ultimately, the safety of this group was also confirmed by subsequent test results in the United States and Australia.

In 2020, Ajinomoto along with other activists launched the #RedefineCRS campaign to combat the myth that MSG is harmful to people's health, which highlights both the underlying xenophobic biases against Asian cuisine and scientific evidence that the myth is false.

Indonesian pork incident
In early 2001, Ajinomoto was involved in an incident in Indonesia, a predominantly Muslim country, when it was revealed that a pork-based enzyme had been used in its MSG production. According to Islamic dietary laws, pork is a haram (forbidden) meat, and is regarded as unclean. Immediately after the incident, the Food and Drug Administration of the Indonesian government stepped up to announce that Ajinomoto's end product did not contain pig-derived substances. Additionally, Ajinomoto also announced that its products were derived from soybeans.

Aspartame
In 2008, Ajinomoto sued British supermarket chain Asda, part of Walmart, for a malicious falsehood action concerning its aspartame product when the chemical was listed as excluded from the chain's product line along with other "nasties". In July 2009, a British court found the case in Asda's favor. In June 2010, an appeal court reversed the decision, allowing Ajinomoto to pursue a case against Asda to protect the reputation of its aspartame. At that time, Asda said that it would continue to use the term "no nasties" on its own-label products, but the suit was settled out of court in 2011 after Asda removed references to aspartame from its packaging.

See also

References

External links

 
  Wiki collection of bibliographic works on Ajinomoto

 
Companies listed on the Tokyo Stock Exchange
Companies listed on the Osaka Exchange
Chemical companies established in 1917
Japanese brands
Food and drink companies established in 1917
Japanese companies established in 1917
Condiment companies
Multinational companies headquartered in Japan
Multinational food companies
1940s initial public offerings